The Bill Russell NBA Finals Most Valuable Player Award (formerly known as the NBA Finals Most Valuable Player Award) is an annual National Basketball Association (NBA) award given since the 1969 NBA Finals. The award is decided by a panel of eleven media members, who cast votes after the conclusion of the Finals. The person with the highest number of votes wins the award. The award was originally a black trophy with a gold basketball-shaped sphere at the top, similar to the Larry O'Brien Trophy, until a new trophy was introduced in 2005 to commemorate Bill Russell.

Since its inception, the award has been given 54 times to 33 players. Michael Jordan is a record six-time award winner. LeBron James has won the award four times in his career, and Magic Johnson, Shaquille O'Neal, and Tim Duncan won three times each. Jordan and O'Neal are the only players to win the award in three consecutive seasons (Jordan accomplished the feat on two occasions). Johnson is the only rookie ever to win the award, as well as the youngest at 20 years and 276 days old. In 1985, Kareem Abdul-Jabbar became the oldest to win at 38 years and 54 days old. Andre Iguodala is the only winner to have not started every game in the series. In the 1969 finals, Jerry West, the first-ever awardee, is the only person to win the award while being on the losing team.

Willis Reed, Abdul-Jabbar, Larry Bird, Hakeem Olajuwon, Kobe Bryant, Kawhi Leonard and Kevin Durant won the award twice. Olajuwon, Durant, Bryant, and James have won the award in two consecutive seasons. James is the only player to have won the award with three different teams, while he and Leonard are the only players to have won the award in both conferences. Johnson, Moses Malone, Durant, and Leonard are the only players to have been named Finals MVP in their first season with a team. Olajuwon of Nigeria (who became a naturalized U.S. citizen in 1993), Tony Parker of France, Dirk Nowitzki of Germany and Giannis Antetokounmpo of Greece are the only international players to win the award. Duncan is an American citizen, but is considered an "international" player by the NBA because he was not born in one of the fifty states or Washington, D.C. Parker, Nowitzki and Antetokounmpo are the only winners to have been trained totally outside the U.S.; Olajuwon played college basketball at Houston and Duncan at Wake Forest. Cedric Maxwell and Chauncey Billups are the only Finals MVP winners eligible for the Hall of Fame who have not been voted in.

On February 14, 2009, during the 2009 NBA All-Star Weekend in Phoenix, then-NBA Commissioner David Stern announced that the award would be renamed the "Bill Russell NBA Finals Most Valuable Player Award" in honor of 11-time NBA champion Bill Russell.

Winners

Multi-time winners

Teams

See also 

 NBA Most Valuable Player Award
 NBA Conference Finals Most Valuable Player Award
 NBA All-Star Game Kobe Bryant Most Valuable Player Award

Notes

References 
General

 
 

Specific

Finals Most Valuable Player Award
Most Valuable Player Award
National Basketball Association lists
Awards established in 1969
National Basketball Association most valuable player awards
Basketball most valuable player awards